Lale Oraloğlu (15 August 1924 – 15 January 2007) was a Turkish actress and screenwriter. She appeared in 28 films and television shows between 1952 and 2006. She starred in the film The Broken Pots, which was entered at the 11th Berlin International Film Festival. Her father was the Tatar-born scientist-writer Lebib Karan. (1887-1964).

Selected filmography
 The Broken Pots (1960)

References

External links

1924 births
2007 deaths
Turkish film actresses
Turkish female screenwriters
Deutsche Schule Istanbul alumni
20th-century Turkish actresses
21st-century Turkish actresses
20th-century Turkish screenwriters